President of the Constitutional Court may refer to:
  : President of the Constitutional Court (Austria)
  : President of the Constitutional Council (France)
  : Chief Justice of the Constitutional Court of Indonesia
  : President of the Constitutional Court of Italy
  : President of the Constitutional Court of South Africa
  : President of the Constitutional Court of Korea
  : President of the Constitutional Court (Spain)
  : President of the Constitutional Court of Turkey